Daniel Żółtak (born February 28, 1984) was a Polish handball player.

He played for the national team, winning a bronze medal in the World Handball Championship in 2009.

References 

 Player profile on Polish Handball Association website

1984 births
Living people
Polish male handball players
Sportspeople from Olsztyn
Vive Kielce players